"Seein' My Father in Me" is a song co-written and recorded by American country music artist Paul Overstreet.  It was released in January 1990 as the fourth single from his album Sowin' Love. The song reached #2 on the Billboard Hot Country Singles & Tracks chart in March 1990.  It was written by Overstreet and Taylor Dunn. The song won Country Recorded Song of the Year at the 22nd GMA Dove Awards in 1991.

Music video
The music video was directed by Jack Cole. It features Overstreet singing the song, as well as interacting with shots of their fathers.

Chart performance

Year-end charts

Accolades
GMA Dove Awards

References

1990 singles
Paul Overstreet songs
Songs written by Paul Overstreet
Song recordings produced by James Stroud
RCA Records singles
1989 songs
Songs about fathers